Maurice Rupert Bishop (29 May 1944 – 19 October 1983) was a Grenadian revolutionary and the leader of New Jewel Movement – a Marxist–Leninist party which sought to prioritise socio-economic development, education, and black liberation – that came to power during the 13 March 1979 revolution that removed Eric Gairy from office. Bishop headed the People's Revolutionary Government of Grenada from 1979 to 1983, when he was dismissed from his post and executed during the coup by Bernard Coard, leading to upheaval.

Early life 
Maurice Rupert Bishop was born on 29 May 1944 on the island of Aruba, then a colony of the Netherlands as part of the Territory of Curaçao. His parents, Rupert and Alimenta Bishop, came from the northeast of Grenada, where his father earned only 5 British pence per day. At the end of 1930, to improve his financial position, he moved to work in the oil refinery on Aruba with his wife Alimenta.

Until the age of six, Maurice was raised in Aruba with two older sisters Ann and Maureen. In 1950 his father took the family back to Grenada and opened a small retail shop in the capital, St. George's. Maurice was sent to study at the Wesleyan elementary school, but after a year Maurice was transferred to the Roman Catholic St George primary and high school. At the age of nine Maurice was teased because of his height which made him look much older. As an only son, his father pushed his education and expected much of him. He expected perfect grades from him, not 95 but 100%, and when the family purchased a car his mother expected him to walk to school like the others.

For his secondary education, Bishop received one of the four government scholarships for study at the Roman Catholic Presentation Brothers' College. He was elected president of the Student Council, of the Discussion Club, and of the History Study Group, along with editing the newspaper Student Voice and participating in sports. He later recalled: "Here I had much interest in politics, history and sociology." He also established contacts with students from the Anglican Grenada Boys' Secondary School, his own school's competitors. He was an ardent supporter of the West Indies Federation established in 1958 and the ideas of Caribbean nationalism. He also recalled the great interest the 1959 Cuban Revolution aroused in him. Bishop recalled: "In fact, for us it did not matter what we heard on the radio or read in the colonial press. For us, it comes down to the courage and legendary heroism of Fidel Castro, Che Guevara. ...Nothing could overshadow this aspect of the Cuban Revolution."

In those same years Bishop and his colleagues became interested in reading the works of Julius Nyerere and Frantz Fanon. In 1962 Bishop graduated with a gold medal for his outstanding ability.

Shortly before graduation, in early 1962, Bishop and youth leader from Grenada Boys' Secondary School Bernard Coard, created the Grenada Assembly of Youth Fighting for Truth, designed to bring the island youth to political life in a debate over pressing issues. Members gathered on Friday in St. George's main square and arranged open political debates among the people. Both friends and enemies celebrated his charisma and good oratory skills, including his skilful use of humor in his speeches.

Political career

Education in England 
The group's activities ended nine months later when Bishop and the other Assembly leaders left to study at universities in Europe and the United States. In December 1963 the 19-year-old Maurice Bishop arrived in London to study law at the University of London, and Coard travelled to the US to study economics at Brandeis University. In London, Bishop received a Bachelor of Law degree at Gray's Inn in 1966. He often worked in London as a postman or vegetable packer. In 1963–66, Bishop was president of the Students Association of Holborn College and in 1967 headed the association of students of the Royal College. While studying Grenadian history, Bishop focused on anti-British speeches and Julien Fédon, the head of the 1795 uprising. In 1964 he participated the UK's West Indian Standing Conference (WISC) and Campaign Against Racial Discrimination (CARD). He travelled from the UK to socialist Czechoslovakia and the German Democratic Republic. During this period he studied the works of Marx, Lenin, Stalin, and Mao Zedong. Bishop was particularly impressed by Julius Nyerere's Ujamaa: Essays on Socialism (published by Oxford University Press in 1968) and the Arusha Declaration of 1967.

From 1967 to 1969 Bishop worked on his thesis "Constitutional Development of Grenada", but left the job because of disagreements with the supervisor in assessing the 1951 disturbances. In 1969 he received a law degree and became one of the founders of the Legal Aid Office of the West Indies community in London's Notting Hill Gate. This was volunteer work, and his main source of income came from work as an auditor of additional taxes on the British Civil Service. During this period he corresponded with friends and developed a two-year plan of activities upon his return to Grenada. The plan called for temporary withdrawal from participation in political activities and his work as a lawyer to co-create an organization capable of taking power on the island.

Returning to Grenada in December 1970, Bishop gave legal defence to striking nurses at St. George's General Hospital, who hoped to improve the living conditions of patients. He was arrested along with 30 other protestors. All were acquitted after a seven-month trial. In 1972 Bishop helped organize a conference in Martinique that discussed and strategized actions for liberation movements. The philosophy of Julius Nyerere and Tanzanian socialism were guiding elements for the Movement for Assemblies of the People (MAP) which Bishop helped organize after the elections of 1972. Bishop and co-founders Kenrick Radix and Jacqueline Creft were interested in steering MAP toward construction of popular institutions centred in villages, to facilitate broad participation in the country's affairs.

In January 1973 MAP merged with the Joint Endeavor for Welfare, Education, and Liberation (JEWEL) to form the New Jewel Movement (NJM). Bishop shared the leadership as Joint Coordinating Secretary with Unison Whiteman.

Grenada "Bloody Sunday" 
On 18 November 1973, Bishop and other leaders of the New Jewel Movement were driving in two cars from St George's to Grenville, where they were to meet with businessmen of the city. Security forces under Assistant Chief Constable Aynesent Belmar overtook Bishop's motorcade. Nine people were captured, arrested, and beaten by the government. In prison they shaved their beards, revealing Bishop's broken jaw. These events became known in Grenada as "Bloody Sunday."

"Bloody Monday" 
Bishop joined a mass demonstration against Grenadian Premier Eric Gairy on 21 January 1974. As his group returned to their hotel, they were pelted with stones and bottles by Gairy's supporters, and the security forces used tear gas. Rupert Bishop, Maurice's father, was leading women and children away from the danger, and was himself shot and killed at the door of the hotel. This became known in Grenada as "Bloody Monday." After this event, Bishop noted "we realized that we were unable to lead the working class," since the party had no influence in city workers' unions or among the rural folk loyal to Gairy. With his colleagues, he developed a new strategy, shifting focus from propaganda and mobilization for anti-government demonstrations toward organization of party groups and cells.

Independence Day 
On 6 February 1974, the day before the proclamation of the independent state of Grenada, Bishop was arrested on charges of plotting an armed anti-government conspiracy and taken to the Fort George prison. Police said that while searching his house they found weapons, ammunition, equipment, and uniforms, along with a plan to assassinate Eric Gairy in a night club, and a scheme for guerrilla camps. The day after Independence day, on 8 February 1974, Bishop was released on bail and soon after went to the United States. On 29 March 1974 he participated in a meeting of the Regional Steering Committee of the Pan-African Congress in Guyana. He also continued his law practice, in October 1974 defending Desmond "Ras Kabinda" Trotter and Roy Mason who were accused of murdering an American tourist.

In October 1975 he spoke at a seminar on "Fascism: A Caribbean Reality?", organized by the Oilfields Workers' Trade Union in Trinidad, and represented the Nutmeg Board as solicitor in High Court. In November 1975 the NJM Political Bureau formed a Grenada-Cuba Friendship Association, with Bishop as one of the initial leaders.

Leader of the Opposition 
In 1976, he was elected to represent St. George's South-East in Parliament. From 1976 to 1979 he held the position of Leader of the Opposition in the House of Representatives of Grenada, opposing the government of Prime Minister Eric Gairy and his Grenada United Labour Party (GULP), which maintained power by terrorism and fraudulent elections.  In May 1977 Bishop made his first visit to Cuba, with Unison Whiteman, as leaders of the NJM and guests of the Cuban Institute of Friendship with People (ICAP).

Premiership 

In 1979 Bishop's party staged a revolution and deposed Gairy, who was out of the country addressing the United Nations. Bishop became Prime Minister of Grenada and suspended the constitution.

Bishop established a relationship with Cuba after he took power. He initiated a number of projects, most significantly, the building of a new international airport on the island's southern tip (renamed in his memory in May 2009). Financing and labour for the construction of the airport came from Cuba, although most of the airport's infrastructure was designed by European and North American consultants. American President Ronald Reagan accused Grenada of intending to use the new airport's long "airstrip" as a waypoint for Soviet military aircraft.

Among Bishop's core principles were workers' rights, women's rights, and the struggle against racism and apartheid. Under Bishop's leadership, the National Women's Organization was formed which participated in policy decisions along with other social groups. Women were given equal pay and paid maternity leave, and sex discrimination was made illegal. Organisations for education (Centre for Popular Education), health care, and youth affairs (National Youth Organization) were also established. Despite its achievements, Bishop's government would not hold elections and stifled the free press and the opposition.

The People's Revolutionary Army (PRA) was also formed during Bishop's administration. Critics claimed that the army was a waste of resources, and there were complaints that the PRA was used as a tool to commit human rights abuses, like detention of political dissidents. The establishment of voluntary mass organizations of women, farmers, youth, workers, and militia were presumed to make the holding of elections unnecessary. Moreover, it was believed that 
elections could be manipulated by the input of large sums of money from foreign interests.

Bishop has been quoted at length on the dynamics of democracy:
   There are those ... who believe that you cannot have a democracy unless there is a situation where every five years ... people are allowed to put an "X" next to some candidate's name, and ... they return to being non-people without the right to say anything to their government, without any right to be involved in running their country. ...Elections could be important, but for us the question is one of timing. ...We would much rather see elections come when the economy is more stable, when the Revolution is more consolidated. When more people have in fact had benefits brought to them. When more people are literate ...The right of freedom of expression can really only be relevant if people are not too hungry, or too tired to be able to express themselves. It can only be relevant if appropriate grassroots mechanisms rooted in the people exist, through which the people can effectively participate. ...We talk about the human rights that the majority has never been able to enjoy, ... a job, to decent housing, to a good meal. ...These human rights have been the human rights for a small minority over the years in the Caribbean and the time has come for the majority of the people to begin to receive those human rights for the first time."

While Bishop introduced free public health, illiteracy dropped from 35% to 5% and unemployment went from 50% to 14%,  his weak point was tourism. He unpacked the old project of an international airport and asked his friend Fidel Castro for help.

When Bernard Coard arrested Bishop, protesters numbering 30,000 on an island of 100,000 gathered, and even the guards joined the protest, resulting in the release of Bishop. But Bishop, knowing the determination of the Coard faction, confided in a journalist: "I am a dead man."

Arrest and execution 
In 1983, disputes among the party leadership occurred. A military junta group within the party tried to make Bishop either step down or agree to a power-sharing agreement with Deputy Prime Minister Bernard Coard. Bishop rejected these proposals and was eventually deposed and placed under house arrest during the first week of October 1983 by Coard. Large public demonstrations throughout the island demanded Bishop's freedom and restoration to power. During one demonstration, the crowd freed Bishop from house arrest. First in a truck, then by car, Bishop made his way to the army headquarters at Fort Rupert (known today as Fort George). After he arrived, a military force was dispatched from Fort Frederick to Fort Rupert. Bishop and seven others, including cabinet ministers, were captured. Then a four-man People's Revolutionary Army firing squad executed Bishop, three members of his Cabinet and four others by machine-gunning them. After he was dead, a gunman slit his throat and cut off his finger to steal his ring. The bodies were then transported to a military camp and partially burned in a pit. The location of their remains is still unknown.

Partly as a result of Bishop's murder, the Organization of Eastern Caribbean States (OECS) and the nations of Barbados and Jamaica appealed to the United States for assistance, as did Sir Paul Scoon, Governor-General of Grenada, and U.S. President Ronald Reagan launched an invasion.

Family 
Maurice Bishop married nurse Angela Redhead in 1966. They had two children, Nadia (born 1969) and John (born 1971). Angela emigrated to Toronto, Ontario, Canada, with both children in 1981, while Bishop was still prime minister. He also fathered a son, Vladimir Creft (1978–1994), with his longtime partner Jacqueline Creft, who was Grenada's Minister of Education. Jacqueline Creft was killed alongside Bishop at the confrontation at Fort Rupert (known as Fort George today) on 19 October 1983. After his parents' deaths, Vladimir joined his half-siblings in Canada, but was stabbed to death in a Toronto nightclub at the age of 16.

Legacy 
In 1983, he was awarded the Czechoslovak Order of the White Lion award. On 29 May 2009, Grenada's international airport (formerly Point Salines International Airport) was renamed Maurice Bishop International Airport. Speaking at the ceremony, St. Vincent and the Grenadines Prime Minister Ralph Gonsalves said: "This belated honour to an outstanding Caribbean son will bring closure to a chapter of denial in Grenada's history."

See also 
 Grenada 17

References

External links 

1944 births
1983 deaths
Alumni of the London School of Economics
Alumni of King's College London
Members of Gray's Inn
Members of the House of Representatives of Grenada
Prime Ministers of Grenada
Foreign ministers of Grenada
Executed prime ministers
Grenadian Marxists
People executed by Grenada by firing squad
Executed Grenadian people
New Jewel Movement politicians
Grenadian communists
Anti-revisionists
Communism in Grenada
Leaders who took power by coup
Leaders ousted by a coup
Heads of government who were later imprisoned
20th-century Grenadian politicians